Grand Duke Konstantin Konstantinovich of Russia (22 August 1858 – 15 June 1915) was a grandson of Emperor Nicholas I of Russia, and a poet and playwright of some renown.  He wrote under the pen name "K.R.", initials of his given name and family name, Konstantin Romanov.

Early life
His eldest sister Grand Duchess Olga married King George I of the Hellenes in 1867.

From his early childhood KR was more interested in letters, art, and music than in the military upbringing required for Romanov boys. Nevertheless, the Grand Duke was sent to serve in the Imperial Russian Navy.  KR was unsatisfied, and left the navy to join the elite Izmailovsky Regiment of the Imperial Guard, where he served with distinction.

Public life

KR was both a patron of Russian art and an artist in his own right.  A talented pianist, the Grand Duke was Chairman of the Russian Musical Society, and counted Tchaikovsky among his closest friends.  But KR was first and foremost a man of letters.  He founded several Russian literary societies.  He translated foreign works (including Schiller and Goethe) into Russian, and was particularly proud of his Russian translation of Hamlet.  An accomplished poet and playwright, KR also took great interest in the direction of his plays.  The Grand Duke actually appeared in his last play, "King of Judea," playing the role of Joseph of Arimathea.

The Grand Duke's artistic slavophilism and devotion to duty endeared him to both Alexander III and Nicholas II.  The former appointed KR as President of the Russian Academy of Sciences, and later as Chief of All Military Colleges. He was also made an honorary member of the Royal Swedish Academy of Sciences in 1902, with reference to his chairmanship of a Swedish-Russian surveying commission.

KR and his wife were among the relatively few Romanovs on intimate terms with Nicholas II and the Empress Alexandra, who found KR's devotion to his family a welcome respite from the playboy lifestyle of many of the other Grand Dukes.

He was also a close friend of the Grand Duchess Elizabeth and wrote a poem about her expressing his admiration when she first came to Russia to be married. He was also one of the few members of the Imperial Family to go to Moscow to attend the funeral of Elizabeth's husband, Grand Duke Sergei Alexandrovich, who was killed by a terrorist's bomb.

Marriage and family
 
KR married in 1884 in St Petersburg Princess Elisabeth of Saxe-Altenburg, his second cousin.  Upon her marriage, Elisabeth became the Grand Duchess Elizaveta Mavrikievna.  She was known within the family as "Mavra." KR was, by all accounts, devoted to his wife and children, and a loving father.  He and his family made their home at Pavlovsk, a suburban palace of St. Petersburg, and a favorite residence of KR's great-grandfather, the Emperor Paul I.

The couple would have a total of nine children:

Prince John (1886–1918)
Prince Gabriel (1887–1955)
Princess Tatiana (1890–1979)
Prince Konstantin (1891–1918)
Prince Oleg (1892–1914)
Prince Igor (1894–1918)
Prince Georgy (1903–1938)
Princess Natalia (died at exactly two months, 1905)
Princess Vera (1906–2001)

Prince John married Princess Helen of Serbia (daughter of King Peter of Serbia) in 1911.  Princess Tatiana married Prince Konstantin Bagration-Muhransky, a Georgian prince, that same year.

KR's children were the first to fall under the new Family Law promulgated by Emperor Alexander III. It stated that henceforth, only the children and male-line grandchildren of a Tsar would be styled Grand Duke or Grand Duchess with the style of Imperial Highness -- great-grandchildren and their descendants would be styled either "Prince of Russia" or "Princess of Russia" with the style of Highness.  The revised Family Law was intended to cut down on the number of persons entitled to salaries from the Imperial treasury.

Sexuality

As exemplary and dedicated (and even conservative) as KR's public life was, his private turmoil was intense. Had it not been for the publication of KR's strikingly candid diaries long after his death, the world would have never known that this most prolific of Grand Dukes, the father of nine children, was tormented by his homosexual feelings.

As mentioned, KR's first homosexual experiences occurred in the Imperial Guards.  The Grand Duke made great efforts to repress his feelings.  But despite his love for his wife, KR could not resist the temptations offered to a person of his exalted state. KR claimed in his diary that between 1893 and 1899 he remained away from the practice of what he called his "main sin." Yet by the birth of his seventh child, KR had become a steady visitor to several of the male brothels of St. Petersburg. In 1904 he wrote in his diary that he "ordered my coachman...to go, and continued on foot past the bath-house. I intended to walk straight on... But without reaching the Pevchesky Bridge, I turned back and went in. And so I have surrendered again, without much struggle, to my depraved inclinations."  The cycle of resistance and capitulation to temptation is a common theme of KR's diaries.

By the end of 1904, KR became somewhat attached to an attractive young man by the name of Yatsko. "I sent for Yatsko and he came this morning. I easily persuaded him to be candid. It was strange for me to hear him describe the familiar characteristics: he has never felt drawn to a woman, and has been infatuated with men several times. I did not confess to him that I knew these feelings from my own personal experience. Yatsko and I talked for a long time. Before leaving he kissed my face and hands; I should not have allowed this, and should have pushed him away, however I was punished afterwards by vague feelings of shame and remorse. He told me that, ever since the first time we met, his soul has been filled with rapturous feelings towards me, which grow all the time. How this reminds me of my own youth." A few days later, KR and Yatsko met again, and a relationship developed between the two.

In KR's final years, he wrote of his homosexual urges less and less, whether from having reached some arrangement with his conscience, or from the natural advance of age and ill health.

War years and death
The outbreak of World War I found KR and his wife in Germany, where they were taking the cure in Wildungen. Caught in enemy territory, the couple attempted a quick return to Russia. Their plans were disrupted by German authorities, who claimed the Grand Duke and his wife were political prisoners. Grand Duchess Elizaveta sent a message to the German Imperial couple asking for their help. Eventually KR and his entourage were allowed to depart Germany and transported to the first Russian station. The weakened KR had to proceed by foot across the front lines. By the time K.R. and Elizaveta arrived in St. Petersburg, now renamed Petrograd, the Grand Duke was in a dismal state of health.

The first year of the war took a cruel toll on his immediate family. Five of his six sons served in the Russian Army, and in October 1914, his fourth and most talented son, Prince Oleg, was mortally wounded fighting against the Germans. The following March, his son-in-law Prince Bagration-Muhransky was killed on the Caucasus front.

Fate of KR family after the Russian Revolution

The Princes Ioann, Gavriil, Konstantin, and Igor were all arrested after the Bolshevik seizure of power in October 1917.  Prince Gavriil was kept in Petrograd due to illness, but the other three princes were deported to Alapaevsk, a small town in the Urals.  There they were imprisoned for some months, together with the Grand Duchess Elizaveta Feodorovna, Grand Duke Sergei Mikhailovich, and Prince Vladimir Paley. On the night of 17–18 July 1918 (24 hours after the execution of Nicholas II and his immediate family in Ekaterinburg), the Alapaevsk prisoners were executed by their Bolshevik captors.  Their bodies were recovered from an abandoned mine shaft by the White Army, and reburied in the Church of the Martyrs near Beijing, China.

Prince Gavriil was released from prison through the intercession of Maxim Gorki, who had unsuccessfully tried to save several other Romanovs.  Gavriil and his wife (whom he had married after the Revolution) emigrated and settled in Paris, where Gavriil died in 1955.

The widowed Princess Tatiana fled to Romania and later to Switzerland with her children.  She eventually became a nun, and died in Jerusalem in 1979, where she had been Abbess of the Orthodox Mount of Olives Convent.

KR's wife and two youngest children, Prince George and Princess Vera, remained at Pavlovsk throughout the war, the chaotic rule of the Provisional Government, and after the October Revolution.  In the fall of 1918, they were permitted by the Bolsheviks to be taken by ship to Sweden (on the Ångermanland, via Tallinn to Helsinki and via  Mariehamn to Stockholm), at the invitation of the Swedish queen.

At Stockholm harbor they met prince Gustaf Adolf who took them to the royal palace. Elizaveta Mavrikievna and Vera and Georgi lived for the next two years in Sweden, first in Stockholm then in Saltsjöbaden; but Sweden was too expensive for them so they  moved first to Belgium by invitation of Albert I of Belgium, and then to  Germany, settling in Altenburg where they lived 30 years, except for a couple of years in England. Elizaveta  died of cancer on 24 March 1927 in Leipzig. Prince Georgi died in New York City in 1938. Princess Vera lived in Germany until Soviet forces occupied the east part of the country, she fled to Hamburg and in 1951 she moved to United States and died there in 2001, in Nyack, New York.

As of 2005, KR has at least ten living descendants: the three children of Princess Ekaterina (daughter of KR's son Prince Ioann) and her seven grandchildren. One of them is American actor Sebastian Arcelus.

Archives 
Documents about Grand Duke Konstantin Konstantinovich's family (including correspondence and photographs) are preserved in the "Romanov Family Papers" collection in the Hoover Institution Archives (Stanford, California, USA).

Honours and awards
The Grand Duke received the following Russian and foreign decorations:
Russian
Knight of St. Andrew, 26 September 1858
Knight of St. Alexander Nevsky, 26 September 1858
Knight of St. Anna, 1st Class, 26 September 1858
Knight of the White Eagle, 26 September 1858
Knight of St. Stanislaus, 1st Class, 11 June 1865
Knight of St. George, 4th Class, 15 October 1877
Knight of St. Vladimir, 4th Class, 1883; 3rd Class, 14 May 1896; 2nd Class, 1903; 1st Class, 1913

Foreign

Ancestry

References

External links

K. R. Poems (in Russian)
The King of the Jews, (Play), Funk & Wagnalls, NY, 1914. from Archive.org

1858 births
1915 deaths
Writers from Saint Petersburg
People from Tsarskoselsky Uyezd
House of Holstein-Gottorp-Romanov
Russian grand dukes
Russian dramatists and playwrights
Russian male dramatists and playwrights
Russian male poets
Bisexual writers
Russian LGBT dramatists and playwrights
LGBT royalty
Russian LGBT poets
19th-century Russian LGBT people
19th-century people from the Russian Empire
20th-century Russian LGBT people
Members of the Royal Swedish Academy of Sciences
Grand Croix of the Légion d'honneur
Grand Crosses of the Order of Saint Stephen of Hungary
Recipients of the Order of Saint Stanislaus (Russian), 1st class
Recipients of the Order of St. Anna, 1st class
Recipients of the Order of St. George of the Fourth Degree
Recipients of the Order of St. Vladimir, 1st class
Recipients of the Order of the White Eagle (Russia)
Burials at Saints Peter and Paul Cathedral, Saint Petersburg